Batheulima is a genus of medium-sized sea snails, marine gastropod mollusks in the family Eulimidae.

Distribution
 Marine

Species
Species within the genus Batheulima include the following:
 Batheulima abbreviata (Jeffreys, 1884)
 Batheulima epixantha Simone, 2002
 Batheulima fuscoapicata (Jeffreys, 1884)
 Batheulima thurstoni Bouchet & Warén, 1986
Species brought into synonymy
 Batheulima apicofusca Locard, 1897: synonym of Batheulima fuscoapicata (Jefferys, 1884)
 Batheulima lutescens (Simone, 2002): synonym of Eulimacrostoma lutescens (Simone, 2002) (original combination)

References

 Nordsieck F. (1968). Die europäischen Meeres-Gehäuseschnecken (Prosobranchia). Vom Eismeer bis Kapverden und Mittelmeer. Gustav Fischer, Stuttgart VIII + 273 pp
 Warén, A. (1984). A generic revision of the family Eulimidae (Gastropoda, Prosobranchia). Journal of Molluscan Studies. suppl 13: 1-96.
page(s): 32

External links
 To World Register of Marine Species

Eulimidae
Gastropod genera